The Japan Federation of Media, Advertising, Motion Picture, and Theater Labor Unions (MEDIA ROREN) is a trade union representing workers in the media, advertising and entertainment industries in Japan.

The union was founded in October 2017, with the merger of the Federation of All-NHK Labour Unions, and the National Cinema and Theater Workers' Union.  Like both its predecessors, it affiliated to the Japanese Trade Union Confederation.  By 2020, it had 9,577 members.

References

Entertainment industry unions
Trade unions established in 2017
Trade unions in Japan